Florida Man is an Internet meme first popularized in 2013, referring to an alleged prevalence of male persons performing irrational, maniacal, or absurd actions in the U.S. state of Florida. Internet users typically submit links to news stories and articles about unusual or strange crimes and other events occurring in Florida, with stories' headlines often beginning with "Florida Man..." followed by the main event of the story. Because of the way news headlines are typically written, they can be creatively interpreted as implying that the subjects of the articles are all a single individual known as "Florida Man."

The Miami New Times claimed that freedom of information laws in Florida make it easier for journalists to obtain information about arrests from the police than in other states and that this is responsible for the large number of news articles. A CNN article on the meme also suggested that the breadth of reports of bizarre activities is due to a confluence of factors, including public records laws giving journalists fast and easy access to police reports, the relatively high and diverse population of the state, its highly variable weather, and gaps in mental health funding.

Origin 

The meme originated in February 2013 with the Twitter account @_FloridaMan, which quoted notably strange or bizarre news headlines containing the words "Florida man," such as "Florida man run over by van after dog pushes accelerator" or "Police arrest Florida man for drunken joy ride on motorized scooter at Walmart." The account referred to 'Florida Man' as the "World's Worst Superhero" jokingly implying the headlines are not a variety of anonymous persons but a single prolific suspect.

Spread 

Before the creation of the meme, the state of Florida had already garnered a colorful reputation on the Internet, with the social aggregation site Fark hosting a 'Florida' content tag in the years before the Twitter account @_FloridaMan appeared.

After the creation of the account in January 2013, and its ensuing popularization on social media sites such as Reddit and Tumblr, initially through the subreddit 'r/FloridaMan' and the Tumblr blog 'StuckInABucket', the meme was featured in numerous news articles and stories throughout February 2013.

'Florida Man' was also referred to in the opening episode of Season 2 of the FX show Atlanta as a sinister entity, referred to by Darius as an "alt-right Johnny Appleseed" who commits a variety of strange crimes in Florida as part of a plot to keep black voters out, portrayed by Kevin Waterman.

On November 1, 2018, Desi Lydic of The Daily Show filed a report comedically investigating the phenomenon of "Florida Man".

In 2018, IO Interactive released the stealth action video game Hitman 2. In the game's second level, set in Miami, Florida, the players can disguise themselves as "Florida Man," an owner of a local food stand. The player can use this disguise to poison and eliminate their target. The character of Florida Man also makes an appearance in a level set in Berlin, Germany in Hitman 3, where the player can again take his disguise.

A play titled "Florida Man" by Michael Presley Bobbitt premiered July 31, 2019, at New York's Theatre Row Studios.

In 2019, a variation of the meme developed on social media, in which people were encouraged to look up "Florida Man" and the date of their birthday, typically finding a bizarre news report involving a 'Florida Man' on that date. The "Black Judas" who turns in the title characters for reward money in Queen & Slim (2019) and played by Bertrand E. Boyd II, is credited as "Florida Man".

On October 31, 2019, then President of the United States Donald Trump was reported as changing his main residence from New York City to Palm Beach, Florida, the location of the Mar-a-Lago resort he owns and frequently visits. Sources joked about Trump becoming 'Florida Man', including The Daily Show, which released an extension for Google Chrome and Mozilla Firefox that changed all instances of Trump's name to "Florida Man". On October 24, 2020, during his rally for Presidential candidate Joe Biden in Florida, former President Barack Obama mocked Trump, saying, "'Florida Man' wouldn't even do this stuff", referring to Trump's handling of the COVID-19 pandemic and his handling of domestic and foreign affairs.

American classic rock band Blue Öyster Cult referenced the phenomenon in the song "Florida Man" on their 2020 album The Symbol Remains.

The maintainer of the Twitter account @_FloridaMan stated in 2019 that he had "retired" from creating tweets at that account.

On November 16, 2022, the previously pro-Trump New York Post reported his 2024 presidential campaign announcement on the front page as "Florida Man Makes Announcement", proceeding to mock the former president on page 26 referring to Mar-a-Lago as containing his "classified-documents library".

In March 2023 Netflix announced a streaming television limited series titled Florida Man from showrunner (and Florida native) Donald Todd, starring Edgar Ramírez as a disgraced ex-policeman who is forced to return to his native Florida in search of a mobster's missing girlfriend.

Reception 

The meme has widely been seen as a confirmation of the association between the state of Florida and bizarre or humorous activity, and has been compared to the Darwin Awards. However, the meme has also faced some backlash, with the Columbia Journalism Review calling it "one of journalism's darkest and most lucrative cottage industries," where "stories tend to stand as exemplars of the mythical hyper-weirdness of the Sunshine State, but more often simply document the travails of the drug-addicted, mentally ill, and homeless."

See also 

 List of Internet phenomena

References

External links 

 Florida Man on Reddit
 

2010s in Florida
Computer-related introductions in 2013
Crime in Florida
Florida culture
Internet memes introduced in 2013
Men in Florida
Socioeconomic stereotypes